PIM-35, also known as 5-methoxyindolyl-2-methylamine, is a drug which is an indole derivative with a similar chemical structure to that of serotonin. It acts as a serotonin reuptake inhibitor and produces antidepressant-like effects in animal studies.

References 

Amines
Antidepressants
Indoles
Phenol ethers
Serotonin reuptake inhibitors